Gokarna is a village in the Kandi CD block in the Kandi subdivision of Murshidabad district in the state of West Bengal, India.

Geography

Location

Area overview
The area shown in the map alongside, covering Berhampore and Kandi subdivisions, is spread across both the natural physiographic regions of the district, Rarh and Bagri. The headquarters of Murshidabad district, Berhampore, is in this area. The entire area is overwhelmingly rural with over 80% of the population living in the rural areas.

Note: The map alongside presents some of the notable locations in the subdivisions. All places marked in the map are linked in the larger full screen map.

Demographics
According to the 2011 Census of India, Gokarna had a total population of 16,198, of which 8,293 (51%) were males and 7,905 (49%) were females. Population in the age range 0–6 years was 1,919. The total number of literate persons in Gokarna was 9,452 (66.20% of the population over 6 years).

Transport
State Highway 11, running from Mahammad Bazar (in Birbhum district) to Ranaghat (in Nadia district) passes through Gokarna. This section is locally popular as Badshahi Road.

Education
Gokarna P.M. High School was established in 1905 and has facilities for teaching from class V – XII.

Healthcare
Gokarna Rural Hospital functions with 15 beds.

References

Villages in Murshidabad district